(Let us take care, let us watch over), BWV213, is a secular cantata by Johann Sebastian Bach. Bach composed it in Leipzig on a text by Picander and first performed it on 5 September 1733.

History and text 
The work is a dramma per musica describing the story of "Hercules at the crossroads". Bach composed the cantata for the 11th birthday of Crown Prince Friedrich Christian of Saxony, to a text by Picander. It was first performed in Leipzig on 5 September 1733 at Zimmermann's coffeehouse, where Bach's Coffee Cantata was also first performed.

Bach used the aria "" in a revised form in Und es waren Hirten in derselben Gegend, Part II of his Christmas Oratorio. Bach also reused the aria "" to form the aria Ich will nur dir zu Ehren leben in Part 4 of his Christmas Oratorio. A duet of the cantata and the duet "" from his Mass in B minor share a common lost base.

The cantata is counted among the works for celebrations of the Leipzig University, Festmusiken zu Leipziger Universitätsfeiern.

Scoring and structure 

The cantata has four vocal soloists: Lust (soprano), Hercules (alto), Virtue (tenor), and Mercury (bass). It is also scored for a four-part choir, two horns, oboe d'amore, two oboes, two violins, two violas (or viola and bassoon), and basso continuo.

The cantata has 13 movements:

 Chorus: 
 Recitative (alto): 
 Aria (soprano): 
 Duet recitative (soprano, tenor): 
 Aria (alto): 
 Recitative (tenor): 
 Aria (tenor): 
 Recitative  (tenor): 
 Aria (alto): 
 Duet recitative  (alto, tenor): 
 Duet aria (alto, tenor): 
 Recitative (bass): 
 Chorus:

Music 
The opening movement presents a choir of deities giving homage to the young Hercules, with "lullaby-like" chordal instrumental accompaniment. In the first recitative, Hercules establishes the "crossroads" at which he finds himself: a choice between the right path and following his desires. Lust responds with a lullaby-like aria to lure Hercules. The duet recitative "encapsulates the age-old good angel/bad angel, good cop/bad cop dichotomy", leading into an aria in which Hercules is "vacillating between them". The aria adopts the "echo" form prominent in early Italian opera: another alto voice engages in imitative exchanges with Hercules and with the instrumental lines. Virtue proceeds with a secco recitative and "ebullient" aria entreating Hercules to follow the right path that he might "soar on his wings like an eagle to the stars". Virtue concludes with another secco recitative warning Hercules not to succumb to Lust's temptations. Hercules sings a da capo aria expressing his conviction to follow Virtue's advice. The accompanying instrumental lines represent the "writhing of serpents ... being torn apart" by his choice. He then sings a duet recitative with Virtue: "metaphorically she 'weds' herself to him and they end together with a vow of unity". This moves into a long duet aria "with all the quiet tranquility of a love song but, perhaps, one that commits minds and emotions rather than bodies". The character of Mercury appears for the first time in the penultimate movement, accompanied by a "haze of God-like mysticism" created by the strings. The closing chorus is combined with a bass arioso in which Mercury addresses the Crown Prince directly. The movement is stylistically a gavotte with a balanced structure contrasting orchestra and chorus with the bass solo.

Recordings 
 Figuralchor der Gedächtniskirche Stuttgart / Bach-Collegium Stuttgart, Helmuth Rilling. J. S. Bach: Hercules auf dem Scheidwege · Cembalokonzert BWV 1058. Cantate-Musicaphon, 1967.
 Choir & Orchestra of the Age of Enlightenment, Gustav Leonhardt. J. S. Bach: Secular Cantata BWV 211 & 213. Philips, 1994.
 RIAS-Kammerchor / Akademie für Alte Musik Berlin, René Jacobs. J. S. Bach: Cantate Profanes. Harmonia Mundi France, 1994.
 Amsterdam Baroque Orchestra & Choir, Ton Koopman. J. S. Bach: Complete Cantatas  Vol. 5. Erato, 1996.

Notes

References

Cited sources

External links 
 
 
 
 Laßt uns sorgen, laßt uns wachen: history, scoring, Bach website 
 BWV 213 Laßt uns sorgen, laßt uns wachen: English translation, University of Vermont

Secular cantatas by Johann Sebastian Bach
1733 compositions